The Tasman Rugby Union is the governing body for rugby union in Tasman Bay / Te Tai-o-Aorere, a bay at the north end of the South Island in New Zealand. Headquartered in Nelson, TRU is New Zealand's newest provincial union, founded in 2006 with the amalgamation of the existing Marlborough and Nelson Bays sub unions.

The union's premier team is the Tasman Mako which compete in New Zealand's provincial rugby competition, the Bunnings NPC.

Club rugby

There are 22 clubs in the Tasman Union.

History

When the New Zealand Rugby Union (NZRU) reviewed the domestic competitions in 2005, a new 14 team premier division of competition was created, as the Air New Zealand Cup, taking the place of the National Provincial Championship (NPC).

The restructured domestic competition opened the door for the Nelson Bays and Marlborough Rugby Unions to form a relationship, forming one organisation in an attempt to be awarded a position in the new competition.

Early years: 2006 to 2010 

A Tasman 15 played Canada 'A' on April 26, 2006 at Trafalgar Park. The Tasman side won by 40 points, the final score being 48 points to 8. The Mako were grouped in Pool A of the 2006 Air New Zealand Cup.

In their first ever match in the Air New Zealand Cup, the Mako earned a bonus point in a loss to the North Harbour team, losing 33 points to 27. They were defeated by Auckland the following week by 40 points. However, the Mako won their first match in round three, defeating Manawatu by 43 points to 0.
Their only other win of the season came at home against , with an impressive 56–15 win.
Despite the season record of just 2 wins and 7 losses, the Mako showed the ability to compete and provided a platform to build for the future.
Ti'i Paulo captained the side.

The 2007 season was disappointing for the Mako, finishing the season with a record of 2 wins and 8 losses.

Early on in the 2008 season, the NZRU announced that Tasman and  would be relegated from the competition at the end of the season, due to failing to meet a set of criteria including financial stability. With the axe hovering over them, the Mako produced their best season yet, silencing their critics.

In round 2 against , Tasman first five Miah Nikora nailed a stunning last minute drop goal to snatch a 14–16 victory and claim the Mako first scalp over a major union. Facing a strong  side in the quarter finals, the Mako lost 48–10. However, their strong season coupled with public pressure forced the NZRU to reverse its decision and announce that Tasman and  would remain in the competition.

There were doubts as to whether Tasman would contest the 2009 Air New Zealand Cup, with funding issues and disagreement amongst its stakeholders on its future. However, these disputes were resolved and Tasman finished the 2009 season in 9th place with 6 wins and 7 losses, with their most memorable performance coming in round 9 against . Tasman won 12–8 in the most significant result of their short history. The Mako had come from the brink of extinction to topple the biggest union in the country.

2010 was disappointing for the Mako, finishing the season in 12th place on the ladder with just 4 wins, failing to hold on to their mid table status achieved in the previous two seasons. However, the Mako managed to upset eventual champions and neighbours  in round 4, with a famous 27–25 victory at Trafalgar Park.

Championship division: 2011 to 2013 

In 2011, the ITM Cup was restructured into two competitions, with the top 7 teams competing for the Premiership title and the next 7 teams competing for the Championship title. Each province played the other 6 teams in their own division once, plus 4 interdivisional matches.

The Tasman Mako played in the Championship for 2011. Despite taking just 2 wins and finishing in last spot for the season, the Mako were well received by their fans by playing a positive attacking brand of rugby that included 4 losses by 4 points or less. Shane Christie and James Marshall were selected for the New Zealand sevens team that year.

Premiership division: 2014 to 2021 

Tasman was promoted to the ITM Cup Premiership division for the 2014 season.

The Mako played 12 games in the 2014 season with 8 wins, 3 losses and a 16-16 draw against  at Eden Park.

2015 was again a solid year for the Mako, playing 11 games with 7 wins and 4 losses. The Mako made it to the semi final but lost 44-24 against  at Eden Park.

2016 and 2017 were very similar years for the Mako, making the final in both seasons. The 2016 season saw the Mako play 12 games with 8 wins, 3 losses and a 27-27 draw against  at North Harbour Stadium. While the 2017 season saw the Mako play 12 games, winning 7 and losing 5. The team also went through a rebrand, changing the logo and team colours ahead of the 2016 season. The logo was later changed back after it received widespread criticism.

2018 was again a very good year for the Mako, winning 9 out of 10 of their round robin fixtures - losing only to  36-10 at Eden Park. Ahead of the 2018 season, the team changed their name from the Tasman Makos to Tasman Mako, with 'Mako' being the correct plural of the Māori name.

After just 14 seasons the Tasman Mako reached the pinnacle of New Zealand provincial rugby, winning the 2019 Mitre 10 Cup and doing it unbeaten. After going through the round robin with 10 wins from 10 games the Mako played  at Lansdowne Park coming away with a 18-9 win in a game that went right down to the wire. The Mako then had their fourth crack at the Premiership title when they faced  at Trafalgar Park and it was fourth time lucky as the Mako came away with the win 31-14.

The Mako became just the second team to win back to back premiership titles, winning the 2020 Mitre 10 Cup. The Mako finished second on the premiership standings and came up against  in the semi final at Trafalgar Park, coming away with the win 19-10. They qualified for their sixth final in eight years, coming up against  at Eden Park. In what was a thrilling game the Mako came away with the win 12-13.

The Mako bounced back thumping  51–14 before having a crack at the Ranfurly Shield against  where they were again unsuccessful 34–22. The side then played a non competition match against  in miserable conditions, coming away with the win 26–9. A third loss came against  24–20 in Christchurch meaning it was a must win game for the Mako in Round 10 against  where they came away with an impressive 34–22 win.  were favourites ahead of the semi final in Napier after losing only 1 game in the regular season, Tasman came up big hanging on to win 27–33. Yet another final for the Mako and they had a chance to make it a three peat when they met  in the final in Hamilton, the side conceded 2 intercept tries and because of this lost 23–20.

Combined competition: 2022 to present 

2022 was a season full of disappointment for the Mako with just 4 wins from 10 games, failing to make the playoffs for the first time in 11 years. The side was missing many key players with injury and All Blacks duties but still managed to drop many games they should have won.

Ranfurly Shield 
Tasman has not held the Ranfurly Shield but Marlborough held the shield for six challenges in 1973.

Tasman have been involved in three Ranfurly Shield challenges since the union's inception in 2006. Tasman lost their first challenge 26–20 at the hands of Wellington in 2008, and their second challenge 49–40 to Taranaki in 2012. Their third challenge was against Hawke's Bay in 2021, where they were defeated 34–22.

Season standings
The following is a summary of every season for the Tasman Mako since 2006. Position indicates the teams regular season finish.

Key:

Blue bar denotes Championship division

Green fill denotes Cup winner

Bunnings NPC

Records and statistics

All Blacks 
Players that have represented Tasman Mako in any fixture since their inception in 2006, and also played for the All Blacks.
# Represents the players 'All Black cap number'.

Centurions
Players that have played 100 or more games for the Tasman Mako since their inception in 2006.
# Represents the players 'Tasman Mako cap number'.

Source: New Zealand Rugby History

50 or more
Players that have played 50 or more games for the Tasman Mako since their inception in 2006.
# Represents the players 'Tasman Mako cap number'.

Source: New Zealand Rugby History

Top points scorers

Source: New Zealand Rugby History

Top try scorers

Source: New Zealand Rugby History

References

External links
Tasman Mako official website
Bunnings NPC official website

New Zealand rugby union teams
New Zealand rugby union governing bodies
Sport in the Marlborough Region
Sport in the Nelson Region
Sport in the Tasman District
Sports organizations established in 2006